The 2001–02 FAW Premier Cup was the fifth season of the tournament since its founding in 1997.

Group A

Group B

Quarter finals

Semi finals

Final

References

2001-02
2001–02 in Welsh football cups